The 2014 World Lacrosse Championship was held July 10–19 at Dick's Sporting Goods Park outside Denver, Colorado. 38 nations played 142 games in this international men's lacrosse championship tournament organized by the Federation of International Lacrosse. Nine nations—Belgium, China, Colombia, Costa Rica, Israel, Russia, Thailand, Turkey, and Uganda—all competed in the event for the first time.

In the championship game on July 19, Canada captured its third gold medal by upsetting the United States 8–5 in front of 11,861 fans. Canadian goalie Dillon Ward was named the tournament's Most Valuable Player after he made 10 saves in the championship game, becoming the first goalie to ever receive the honor.

The Iroquois Nationals finished third by defeating Australia 16–5 in the bronze medal game. It marked the first time the Iroquois earned a medal at the World Lacrosse Championship, as well as the first time the Australians failed to earn a medal since 1974.

US Lacrosse, the national host, organized a lacrosse festival for boys' and men's lacrosse teams to play alongside the world championships. Players from around the world competed in 11 age divisions from U11 to 60-and-over.

Pool play

For pool play, participating nations were separated into nine divisions. The countries with the top six rankings—Australia, Canada, England, Iroquois, Japan, and the United States—competed in the Blue Division, where the top two teams advanced to the semifinals and the next two teams advanced to the quarterfinals. In the other divisions, each first through fourth place teams were placed in first through fourth play-in brackets.

Blue Division
After not competing in the 2010 tournament in England due to passport issues, the Iroquois Nationals had to appeal to the FIL to play in the elite Blue Division, usually reserved for the top six teams from the previous championship. After originally placing Germany in the Blue Division, the FIL granted the Iroquois' appeal in 2013.

Team USA coasted through the Blue Division games, only tested by Canada's early 3-0 lead in the opening game of the tournament. But the U.S. scored the next eight goals and ended up putting away their strongest rival 10-7. Canada also easily defeated the lower ranked teams, but needed a goal from Curtis Dickson with 19 seconds remaining to beat the Iroquois Nationals 9-8.

Iroquois, Australia, Japan, and England played several close games for the right to get to the championship bracket. Japan lost a double-overtime game vs Australia but won in overtime over England.

Green Division

Grey Division

Orange Division

Plum Division

Red Division

Turquoise Division

White Division

Yellow Division

Play-in brackets
Play-in games were played between the teams of all divisions except Blue.

First qualified teams

Scotland and Israel advanced to the quarterfinals.

Second qualified teams

Third qualified teams

Fourth qualified teams

Championship bracket
After losing to the United States 10–7 in the first game of the tournament, Canada dominated the championship game. They played a deliberate, slow-down offense that is allowed under international rules, combined with strong defense, ground ball play, and goaltending. Like in the first game, Canada jumped out to an early lead, 2–0 after the first quarter. Team USA managed only one goal in the first half, and only put 5 shots on net. At the half, Canada was up 3–1, with Kevin Crowley scoring all three Canadian goals. Crowley got two more in the second half to lead all scorers with 5 points. Canada played even better in the third quarter, scoring five straight goals to increase its lead to 8–2 in the first minutes of the final period. The U.S. added three goals at the end to make the final score 8–5, but they were never in the game in the fourth quarter. Tournament MVP Dillon Ward made 10 saves in goal for Canada. U.S. attackmen Kevin Leveille had three goals and Rob Pannell had three assists.

In the third place game, the Iroquois Nationals easily defeated Australia 16–5 to earn their first medal in international men's field lacrosse. The team earned 4th place in the 1998, 2002, and 2006 tournaments but didn't compete in 2010. The Thompson brothers – Jeremy, Hiana, Miles and Lyle – combined for six goals and five assists.  

{{6TeamBracket-info
|finals=1
|legs=1
|RD1=Quarterfinals16 July
|RD2=Semifinals17 July
|RD3=Gold medal game19 July
|RD3b=Bronze medal game

 
|RD1-team1=  |RD1-score1-1= 8
|RD1-team2=  |RD1-score2-1= 10

|RD1-team3=  |RD1-score3-1=8
|RD1-team4=  |RD1-score4-1=9

|RD2-team1=  |RD2-score1-1=12
|RD2-team2= |RD2-score2-1=6

|RD2-team3=  |RD2-score3-1=22
|RD2-team4=  |RD2-score4-1=3
 

|RD3-team1=  |RD3-score1-1=8 
|RD3-team2=  |RD3-score2-1=5

|RD3b-team1=  |RD3b-score1-1= 16|RD3b-team2=  |RD3b-score2-1= 5
}}

Classification brackets

5th to 8th place
Despite falling to rival England in the fifth-place game, Scotland earned its best-ever finish at the championships by placing sixth.  The Scottish team defeated Japan in the previous contest, and are expected to replace the Japanese in the elite Blue Division at the next world championship tournament.

Playing in its first-ever world championships, Israel very nearly duplicated Scotland's feat, twice narrowly falling in games that could have advanced the team into the Blue Division.  After reaching the quarterfinals, the Israelis led Australia in the third quarter before dropping a tough 9-8 decision. Then in a placement round game, Israel made a dramatic comeback to push England to overtime before suffering a 10-9 setback. Israel finished seventh after defeating Blue Division squad Japan.

9th to 12th Place

13th to 16th Place

17th to 20th place

21st to 24th Place

25th to 28th place

29th to 32nd Place

33rd to 38th place

Final standings

Awards
The following awards were given out at the end of the tournament.MVP:  Dillon Ward  Outstanding Attackman:  Rob Pannell Outstanding Midfielder:  Paul Rabil  Outstanding Defenseman:  Tucker Durkin  Outstanding Goalie''':  Dillon Ward

All-World Team

The President's Team
The President's Team consisted of the following players, honored for being the top 10 players in the tournament not competing in the Blue Division.

 Kyle Buchanan  
 Ryan Licht
 Matt MacGrotty  
 Jimmy McBride 
 Jordan McBride  
 Jonathan Munk  
 Kevin Powers  
 Ben Smith  
 Ari Sussman 
 James Van de Veerdon

 Brendan JR Murphy

See also
 Federation of International Lacrosse, the unified governing body for world lacrosse founded in 2008
 World Lacrosse Championship
 Field lacrosse

References

External links
 Official Website 
 Federation of International Lacrosse
 Denver 2014 tag at Lacrosse All Stars

World Lacrosse Championship
World Lacrosse Championship
International lacrosse competitions hosted by the United States
World Lacrosse Championship